The fifth season of the Georgian reality television series The Voice Georgia premiered on 8 December 2022 on 1TV. Stephane Mgebrishvili was the only coach returning from the previous season and Dato Porchkhidze returned after a two-season hiatus. Meanwhile, Sopo Toroshelidze and Dato Evgenidze debuted as coaches, and Gvantsa Daraselia debuted as the show's presenter.

Broadcaster 1TV announced the opening of applications on 23 August 2022, which would close on 20 September. With this announcement, the channel also revealed that the competition would be used to choose the Georgian representative for the Eurovision Song Contest 2023. The season finale was aired on 2 February 2023. Iru Khechanovi was named as the winner of this season, marking Dato Porchkhidze's third win as a coach.

Teams

Blind auditions 
The blind auditions were aired on 8, 15, 22 and 29 December 2022. In each audition, an artist sings their piece in front of the coaches, whose chairs are facing the audience. If a coach is interested to further work with the artist, they press their button to face the contestant. If a singular coach presses the button, the artist automatically becomes part of their team, and if multiple coaches turn they will compete for the artist, who will decide which team they will join. The artists who qualified for the battles round from each show are shown below.

Battles 
The battles shows were aired on 31 December 2022 and 5 January 2023. In this round, the coaches pick two of their artists to compete in a singing match and select one of them to advance to the next round. Losing artists may be stolen by another coach, becoming new members of their team. Multiple coaches can attempt to steal an artist, resulting in a competition for the artist, who will ultimately decide which team they will go to. Every coach stole two eliminated artists: Ana Vashakmadze and Mariam Toronjadze were stolen by Sopo Toroshelidze, Mariam Kokeladze and Nini Alisiani were stolen by Stephane Mgebrishvili, Ani Nozadze and Kakha Aslamazashvili were stolen by Dato Evgenidze, and Ekaterine Mdivani and Tako Kakalashvili were stolen by Dato Porchkhidze.

Live shows

Quarter-finals (12 and 19 January) 
The quarter-finals took place on 12 and 19 January 2023. The six remaining acts in each team performed and a public televote picked three artists to advance directly to the semi-final. An additional wildcard was then picked by the coach of the team from the eliminated acts. The quarter-finals were the first live shows of the season, with the previous episodes being pre-recorded. Ani Nozadze, who was originally selected to be part of Team Evgena following the battles, withdrew from the competition before the quarter-finals due to health issues.

Semi-final (26 January) 
The semi-final took place on 26 January 2023. The four remaining acts in each team performed and a public televote picked one artist to advance directly to the final. An additional wildcard was then picked by the coach of the team from the eliminated acts.

Final (2 February) 
The final took place on 2 February 2023. The 8 remaining artists performed one after the other, with no eliminations. The singer with the most votes from the public wins the talent show and will represent Georgia in the Eurovision Song Contest 2023.

References 

Season 5